Chloe is a feminine given name.

Chloe may also refer to:

Places
Chloe, West Virginia, an unincorporated community
402 Chloë, an asteroid named after the goddess

Arts, entertainment, and media

Films
Chloé (1996 film), a French television film starring Marion Cotillard
Chloe (2009 film), an erotic thriller film
Chloe, Love Is Calling You, a 1934 American film directed by Marshall Neilan

Music
Chloe, an album by Willie Nelson
"Chloe", a song by Grouplove
"Chloe", a single from Elton John's album The Fox
"Chloe", a song by Spike Jones
"Chlo-e (Song of the Swamp)"
"Chloe (You're the One I Want)", the debut single of American pop rock trio Emblem3 from Nothing to Lose

Other arts, entertainment, and media
 Chloé (artwork), an 1875 painting by Jules Lefebvre
 Chloe (TV series)
 Fictional characters with the name (see Chloe)
 Chloe (Hollyoaks), a character from the British series Hollyoaks

People
 Chloë (Australian singer)
 Chloe Bailey (born 1998), American singer known mononymously as Chlöe
 Chloe Lowery (born 1987), American singer known mononymously as Chloe

Weather formations
Hurricane Chloe, in the 1967 Atlantic hurricane season
Tropical Storm Chloe, in the 1971 Atlantic hurricane season

Other uses
Chloé, a French luxury fashion house established in 1952
Project CHLOE, a civilian anti-missile defence system
Ethinylestradiol/cyproterone acetate, a birth control pill
Chloe, the brand name of the oral contraceptive co-cyprindiol (cyproterone acetate/ethinylestradiol)
Chloe, an epithet for the Greek goddess Demeter, meaning the green shoot
Chloe, DOS software for handling chess problems

See also

Chole (disambiguation), a disambiguation page
Cloe, Pennsylvania, an unincorporated community
"@Chl03k", a song by Modern Baseball